"Blank Pages" is a song recorded by Canadian country music artist Patricia Conroy. It was released in 1993 as the fourth single from her second studio album, Bad Day for Trains. It peaked at number 7 on the RPM Country Tracks chart in August 1993.

Chart performance

Year-end charts

References

1992 songs
1993 singles
Patricia Conroy songs
Warner Music Group singles
Songs written by Patricia Conroy